TM0436 is a putative zinc-binding alcohol dehydrogenase enzyme isolated from Thermotoga maritima. It contains both structural zinc sites and catalytic zinc sites, as well as a Rossmann fold to bind NADH-type ligands. It's a member of the MDR superfamily, which also contains class I mammalian ADH1.

References 

EC 1.1.1
NADH-dependent enzymes
Bacterial proteins